McKenzie Nunatak is a very prominent nunatak which rises to  between McLin Glacier and Graveson Glacier, in the Bowers Mountains of Antarctica. It was mapped by United States Geological Survey from ground surveys and U.S. Navy air photos, 1960–62, and was named by the Advisory Committee on Antarctic Names for glaciologist Garry D. McKenzie, who participated in the study of Meserve Glacier in 1966–67.

Further reading 
  R. L. Oliver, P. R. James, J. B. Jago, Antarctic Earth Science, P 120
  International Symposium on Antarctic Earth Sciences 5th : 1987 : Cambridge, England, Geological Evolution of Antarctica, P 156

External links 

 McKenzie Nunatak on USGS website
 McKenzie Nunatak on SCAR website
 McKenzie Nunatak area map

References 

Nunataks of Victoria Land
Pennell Coast